Taranto Football Club 1927, commonly referred to as Taranto, is a professional Italian football club, based in Taranto, Apulia. Taranto is 19th in the all-time Serie B ranking, though Taranto has not played in Serie B since 1993, having played in the "serie cadetta" 31 times, more than any other Italian club which never played in Serie A.

History

A.S. Taranto
The first team ever founded in the city of Taranto was the Mario Rapisardi, established in 1904. However, in 1904 another team, U.S. Pro Italia, was founded.  That year, the two teams attempted unsuccessfully to merge with each other. In 1911, after the founding of Audace Foot Ball Club by a group of local students, a rivalry between the two teams started, lasting until 1927, when the two teams merged to form A.S. Taranto. The new team first promoted to Serie B in 1935, played only one year in that category. In 1947, after merging with U.S. Arsenale Taranto, another team in the city, the club assumed the name of U.S. Arsenaltaranto, which lasted until 1955, when the old one was restored. In 1965, the new venue was inaugurated, after a hundred days of construction. A number of years played in Serie B and Serie C saw the highest peak ever reached by Taranto in 1977–1978, when the team, led by striker Erasmo Iacovone, was seriously fighting for a surprising promotion.  However, on 6 February 1978, Iacovone was killed in a car accident.  After his death, Taranto's venue was named after him. Taranto left Serie B in 1980/1981 and reached it again three years later.  In 1985 the club was declared bankrupt by magistrates, and was taken over before the end of that season. Because of all that, it was forced to change its name to a different one, Taranto Football Club SpA. However, after more economic woes, the team was disbanded in 1993.

Another club 
A new team, named Taranto Calcio 1906, was established in 1993 and registered to Serie D by the FIGC. The team reached Serie C2/C in 1994/1995, but went into liquidation in 1998, so that a new team, again named U.S. Arsenaltaranto, was admitted to Serie D. In 2000 it was admitted to Serie C2/C, and changed its name to Taranto Calcio Srl. However, in 2004 the team was declared bankrupt one more time, and the consequent bankruptcy auction entrusted the club in the hands of businessman Vito Luigi Blasi, who changed its name in Taranto Sport Srl. In 2005/2006, the team ended second, gaining a spot in the promotion play-offs. The final phase of the Serie C2/C league ended in a triumph for Taranto Sport, which won the playoff finals against Rende and returned to Serie C1/B.

On 29 June 2012 it was excluded from Italian professional football and did not take its place in the 2012–13 championship of Lega Pro Prima Divisione.

Taranto Football Club 1927
On 20 July 2012 the new company Taranto Football Club 1927 S.p.A. was established. It restarted from the Serie D (Girone H) thanks to Article 52 of N.O.I.F. In 2013 the team finished 7th in the league. In 2014 it ended the season in second place and lost to Arezzo in the play-offs. The next season ended in similar fashion, with Taranto ending the season in second place and losing in the play-offs semifinal to Sestri Levante.

In 2015 the club was renamed to Società Sportiva Dilettantistica Taranto Football Club 1927. In 2016 the team finished the season in second place and lost in the play-offs to Fondi, but eventually benefitted from a repechage and promoted to Lega Pro. The following season Taranto finished 20th in Lega Pro/C and thus got relegated back to Serie D after just one season. In 2017–18 the team finished 4th in Serie D/H and lost to Cavese the playoff final. A year later the team finished 3rd in Serie D/H but again lost in the playoff final, this time to Audace Cerignola. The team finished 6th in 2019–20 Serie D/H, thus failing to qualify for the playoffs. In 2020-21, Taranto finished in first place in Group H, thus securing promotion to Serie C.

Colors and badge
The team's colors are red and blue.

Current squad

Out on loan

References

External links
 
 Miky & Genny – Complete database since 1904 and current season
 El jinete marino de Taranto

 
Football clubs in Apulia
Association football clubs established in 1927
Serie B clubs
Serie C clubs
Serie D clubs
1927 establishments in Italy
Phoenix clubs (association football)
1993 establishments in Italy
2012 establishments in Italy